The Eritrean Orthodox Tewahedo Church is one of the Oriental Orthodox Churches with its headquarters in Asmara, Eritrea. Its autocephaly was recognised by Pope Shenouda III of Alexandria, Pope of the Coptic Orthodox Church, after Eritrea gained its independence from Ethiopia in 1993. Thus, the Eritrean Church accords a primacy of honor to the Coptic Church.

History

Origins 
Tewahedo ( täwaḥədo) is a Ge'ez word meaning "being made one", cognate to Arabic tawhid.

According to the Catholic Encyclopedia (1917 edition) article on the Henoticon: around 500 bishops within the Patriarchates of Alexandria, Antioch and Jerusalem refused to accept the "two natures" doctrine decreed by the Council of Chalcedon in 451, thus separating themselves from the rest of Christianity since that time. This separate Christian communion came to be known as Oriental Orthodoxy. The Oriental Orthodox Churches, which today include the Coptic Orthodox Church of Alexandria, the Armenian Apostolic Church, the Syriac Orthodox Church, the Malankara Orthodox Syrian Church of India, the Ethiopian Orthodox Tewahedo Church, and the Eritrean Orthodox Tewahedo Church, are referred to as "Non-Chalcedonian". These churches themselves describe their Christology as miaphysite, but outsiders often incorrectly describe them as "monophysite".

Jesuit interim
Ignatius of Loyola (1491–1556) wished to attempt the task of conversion, but this did not happen. Instead, Pope Paul III sent out  as Patriarch of the East Indies, with Andrés de Oviedo as bishop; and from Goa envoys (followed by Oviedo) went to Ethiopia.

Autocephaly after independence of Eritrea

The first independent Patriarch of Eritrea was Abune Phillipos, who died in 2002 and was succeeded by Abune Yacob. The reign of Abune Yacob as Patriarch of Eritrea was very brief, as he died not long after his enthronement, and he was succeeded by Abune Antonios as 3rd Patriarch of Eritrea. Abune Antonios was elected on 5 March 2004, and enthroned as the third Patriarch of Orthodox Tewahedo Church of Eritrea on 24 April 2004. Pope Shenouda III presided at the ceremony in Asmara, together with the Holy Synod of the Eritrean Orthodox Church and a Coptic Orthodox Church delegation.

In August 2005, Abune Antonios, the Patriarch of the Eritrean Orthodox Tewahedo Church, was confined to a strictly ceremonial role. In a letter dated 13 January 2006, Patriarch Abune Antonios was informed that following several sessions of the church's Holy Synod, he had been formally deposed. In a written response that was widely published, the Patriarch rejected the grounds of his dismissal, questioned the legitimacy of the synod, and excommunicated two signatories to the 13 January 2006 letter, including Yoftahe Dimetros, whom the Patriarch identified as being responsible for the church's recent upheavals. Patriarch Antonios also appealed his case to the Council of the Monasteries of the Eritrean Orthodox Church and to the Coptic Orthodox Church of Alexandria. Abune Antonios was deposed by the Eritrean Holy Synod supposedly under pressure from the Eritrean government; as of 2006 he is under house arrest. 

Abuna Antonios was replaced by Abune Dioskoros as the fourth Patriarch of the church. Patriarch Abuna Dioskoros died on 21 December 2015. Qerlos became the fifth patriarch of the church in June 2021.

Traditions
In common with all Eastern Orthodox, Oriental Orthodox, and Western Orthodox churches; the Catholic Church and the Old Catholic churches of the Union of Utrecht, the Eritrean Orthodox Tewahedo Church professes belief in the seven sacraments of baptism, confirmation, eucharist, confession, the anointing of the sick, matrimony, and holy orders. It regards the first four as being "necessary for every believer".

The church holds the ancient Christian belief in the Real Presence of Christ in the Eucharist stating that "The consecrated bread and wine are the body and blood of Christ. Jesus Christ is truly, really and substantially present in the consecrated elements. In the Eucharist, we eat the blessed flesh of our Lord and drink His precious blood under the form of bread and wine."

As in other Eastern Christian traditions, the bond of marriage is able to be dissolved, but only on the grounds of adultery. To safeguard the practice of the faith, church members are discouraged from marrying people outside of the Orthodox communion. Church members who undergo a purely civil ceremony are not regarded as sacramentally married.

Liturgical language
The traditional liturgical language of the Eritrean Orthodox Tewahedo Church is Geʽez. This was the language of the early Aksumite Christians of the region. Though Geez has no more native speakers, the language is still used for church masses and festivities. But the sibket or sermons are normally in given in the local Tigrinya language. Geez is currently being replaced by Tigrinya, as the principal language for church services.

Biblical canon

The Tewahedo Church Biblical Canon contains 81 books, including almost all of those which are accepted by other Orthodox and Oriental Christians; the exception is the Books of the Maccabees, at least some of which are accepted in the Eastern Orthodox and other Oriental Orthodox churches, but not in the Tewahedo churches (the books of Meqabyan, which are accepted instead, have an etymologically connected name, but rather different content). The Eritrean Orthodox canon and the Ethiopian Orthodox canon are identical.
 The Narrower Canon also contains Enoch, Jubilees, and three books of the Meqabyan;
 The Broader Canon includes all of the books found in the Narrower Canon, as well as the two Books of the Covenant, Four Books of Sinodos, a Book of Clement, and Didascalia;

Similarities to Judaism
Like the Ethiopian Church, the Eritrean Church places a heavier emphasis on Old Testament teachings than one might find in Eastern Orthodox, Roman Catholic, or Protestant churches, and its followers adhere to certain practices that one finds in Orthodox or Conservative Judaism. Like some Eastern Christians, Eritrean Christians traditionally follow dietary rules that are similar to Jewish Kashrut, specifically with regard to how an animal is slaughtered. Similarly, the consumption of pork is prohibited, but unlike Rabbinical Kashrut, Ethiopian cuisine allows the mixing of dairy products with meat. Women are prohibited from entering Eritrean church temples during menses; they are also expected to cover their hair with a large scarf (or a shash) and while they are in church, as described in 1 Corinthians, chapter 11. As in Orthodox synagogues, men and women are seated separately in Eritrean church temples, men are seated on the left and women are seated on the right (while they are facing the altar).

Eritrean Orthodox worshippers remove their shoes when they enter church temples, in accordance with Exodus 3:5 (in which Moses, while he was viewing the burning bush, was commanded to remove his shoes while he was standing on holy ground). Furthermore, the Eritrean Orthodox Tewahedo Church is Sabbatarian, observing the Sabbath on Saturday, in addition to observing the Lord's Day on Sunday, but in commemoration of the Resurrection of Christ, more emphasis is placed upon Sunday. The Eritrean Orthodox Church requires male circumcision, a practice which is nearly universally prevalent among Orthodox men in Eritrea, Eritrean Orthodox circumcise their sons "anywhere from the first week of life to the first few years of life."

Patriarchs and bishops of Eritrea

After declaration of autocephaly of the Eritrean Orthodox Tewahedo Church was recognized by the Coptic Orthodox Church of Alexandria in 1994, the newly established patriarchal seat of Eritrea remained vacant until 1999 when Philipos was elected Abune Phillipos and the first patriarch of Eritrea (1999–2001). He was succeeded by Abune Yacob in 2002 and Abune Antonios in 2004. Abune Antonios's objections to government policy toward the church led to a government decision to depose him and place him under house arrest in 2006.

In April 2007, the Synod elected a new patriarch, Abune Dioskoros, who was the incumbent Patriarch of Eritrea until his death on 21 December 2015, although his reign was disputed by followers of Abune Antonios who endorse the latter as the continuing legitimate Patriarch of the church.

List of abunas 
Vacant from 1994 to 1999, and from December 2015 to June 2021.

 Phillipos (1999–2001)
 Yacob (2002–2003)
 Antonios (2004–2006) – Deposed by the Eritrean government and by the so-called "synod" against the canon of the Church but still regarded as the legitimate Patriarch of the Eritrean Orthodox Tewahdo Church
 Dioskoros (2007–2015) – Replaced Abune Antonios by a vote of confidence from the national body of the church in Eritrea.
 Qerlos (13 May 2021 – 2 December 2022)

See also

 Biblical law in Christianity
 Christianity and Judaism
 Christian observances of Jewish holidays
 Judaizers
 Eastern Christianity
 Eastern Orthodox Christianity
 Ethiopian Orthodox Tewahedo Church
 Oriental Orthodox Christianity

References

Sources

Further reading 

 Article on Eritrean Orthodox Church by Ronald Roberson on the CNEWA website.

External links
Official website

 
National churches
Members of the World Council of Churches
Christian organizations established in the 4th century
4th-century establishments